Travis Johnson may refer to:

Travis Johnson (defensive end) (born 1982), former American football defensive end
Travis Johnson (linebacker) (born 1991), former American football outside linebacker
Travis Johnson (English footballer) (born 2000), English professional footballer
C. Travis Johnson, member of the Louisiana House of Representatives

See also
Travis Johnstone (born 1980), Australian rules footballer